Basra is a village of Chakwal District in the Punjab province of Pakistan. It is located at 32°46'43N 71°59'4E with an altitude of 350 metres (1151 feet). The village is inhabited by the Basra tribe of the Jats

References

Chakwal District
Populated places in Chakwal District